Mollie Maureen (16 August 1904 – 26 January 1987) was an Irish actress who worked mainly in Britain.

Life and career
Maureen was born Elizabeth Mary Campfield in 1904 in Ireland.
Her acting career began in 1939, wherein she acted in a film entitled A Ship in the Bay.
Maureen mainly worked in television, with many minor and/or recurring roles in major shows such as Dr. Finlay's Casebook, Z-Cars, Open All Hours, Last of the Summer Wine and The Sweeney. She also appeared as an elderly lady in an episode of Hammer House of Mystery and Suspense. More prominently, from 1981 to 1983, she had various roles on the Kenny Everett Show.
Other television appearances included playing Lady Glenmire in the 1972 version of Elizabeth Gaskell's Cranford, alongside Pat Coombs.
She played Queen Victoria on two occasions on screen, one of them in The Private Life of Sherlock Holmes, the other in the mini-series The Edwardians.
Her last film appearance was the role of the violently eccentric Mr. F's Aunt in Christine Edzard's two-part adaptation of Little Dorrit, co-starring Joan Greenwood, Max Wall and Sir Alec Guinness.

She died in London, aged 82.

Selected TV and filmography
Little Dorrit as Mr. F's Aunt - 1987
The Comic Strip Presents... (episode: Consuela, or, the New Mrs Saunders) as Mrs Tattle - 1986
Travelling Man (episode: Hustler) - 1985
Hammer House of Horror and Suspense (episode: The Corvini Inheritance) as an elderly lady - 1985
Past Caring as Susan - 1985
Angels (2 episodes) as Miss Draper - 1983
Curse of the Pink Panther as Rich Old Lady - 1983
The Wicked Lady as Doll Skelton - 1983
The Kenny Everett Show (Various Roles) - 1981–1983
Open All Hours (episode: The Cool Cocoa Tin Lid) as Old Woman - 1982
The Setbacks (7 episodes) as Gran - 1981
Great Expectations (3 episodes) as Sarah Pocket - 1981
A Chance to Sit Down as Landlady - 1981
Shoestring (episode: The Farmer had a Wife) as Mother Superior - 1980
Oh Happy Band (episode: Let Bygones be Bygones) - 1980
Born and Bred (episode: C'est si bon) as Mildred - 1980
ITV Playhouse (episode: Hands) as Mrs Spinks - 1980
All Creatures Great and Small (episode: Will to Live) as Alice Temple - 1980
The Orchard End Murder as Old Lady at Station - 1980
Play for Today (episode: Chance of a Lifetime) as Old Mrs. Gallagher - 1980
Danger UXB (episode: Dead Man's Shoes) as Old Woman - 1979
The Hound of the Baskervilles as Mrs Oviatt - 1978
Spearhead (episode: Suspect) as Old Woman - 1978
Jabberwocky as Head Nun (uncredited) - 1977
Beryl's Lot as Mrs Pargeter - 1977
Doctor on the Go (episode: I Love Paris... When I get there) as Sister Murphy - 1977
Happy Ever After (episode: Old Folks' Party) as Mrs. Turner - 1976
Angels (episode: Celebration) as Ellen - 1976
The Return of the Pink Panther as Little Old Lady - 1975
Crossroads as Granny Fraser - 1975
The Sweeney (episode: The Placer) as the Old Woman - 1975
The Venturers (episode: Gilt Edged) as Mrs. Norwood - 1975
Z-Cars (episode: House to House) as Mrs. Best - 1974
Callan as Old Lady in the Strand - 1974
Last of the Summer Wine (episode: The New Mobile Trio) as Walter's Mother - 1973
Crown Court (episode: No Smoke Without Fire Part 1) as Nellie Kent - 1973
Armchair 30 (episode: Ross Evan's Story) as Old Lady - 1973
Follyfoot (episode: The Distant Voice) as Mrs. Padgett - 1973
Owen, M.D. (episode: The Witch of Addington) as Mrs. Gudle - 1973
The Fenn Street Gang (episode: Is Anybody There?) as Lady in Church - 1973
The Edwardians (episode: Daisy) as Queen Victoria - 1973
Cranford (4 episodes) as Lady Glenmire - 1972
Sykes (episode: Marriage) as Muriel - 1972
Clochemerle (4 episodes) as Madame Lagousse - 1972
Spyder's Web (episode: Romance on Wheels) as Mrs. Danvers - 1972
Bachelor Father (episode: Gently Does it) as Great-Aunt Freda - 1971
Public Eye (episode: Who Wants to Be Told Bad News?) as Miss Bain - 1971
The Private Life of Sherlock Holmes as Queen Victoria - 1970

External links

1904 births
1987 deaths
English people of Irish descent
Irish people of English descent
English film actresses
English television actresses
Irish film actresses
Irish television actresses
20th-century English actresses
20th-century Irish actresses